Round Island is a granite island, with an area of 3.95 ha, in south-eastern Australia.  It is part of Tasmania’s Hogan Group, lying in northern Bass Strait between the Furneaux Group and Wilsons Promontory in Victoria.

Fauna
Recorded breeding seabird and wader species include little penguin, short-tailed shearwater, fairy prion, common diving petrel and Pacific gull.  Reptiles present include White's skink and metallic skink.

References

Islands of Tasmania